Brigadier-General Lawrence Nilson (1734–1811) was an East India Company Bombay Army officer.

Military career
Nilson, then the first Chief Engineer of the Bombay Army, formed a company of Pioneer Lascars, comprising 100 men, in 1777. His company took part in the expedition to the Malabar Coast against Tipu Sultan's forces in 1782 during the Second Anglo-Mysore War. He became the Commander-in-chief of the Bombay Army on 6 January 1785 before retiring from that post on 6 September 1788.

References

1734 births
1811 deaths
Commanders-in-chief of Bombay